The Black Travel Movement is a socioentrepreneurial phenomenon that pursues social change by developing travel-related businesses that encourage Black people to travel. The movement emerged in the 2010s, but in the United States its historical roots go back to The Negro Motorist Green Book and to historically Black resorts.

According to researchers Alana Dillette and Stefanie Benjamin, the movement developed in response to "underrepresentation of Black people in the travel sphere" and is informed by critical race theory. Yes! magazine in 2021 said the movement was "exploding" in size and influence.

History of Black travel 
Affluent Black people in the United States first commonly travelled for leisure in the late 1800s via rail and steamship. Those who travelled abroad often commented on the relative sense of freedom they felt when outside of the United States. 

Starting in the early 1900s, resorts were created throughout the U.S. to cater to Black travellers who were unable to travel to other resorts because of segregation or racist policies. Resorts included Idlewild, American Beach, Bethune Beach, Oak Bluffs, Bruce's Beach, Lincoln Hills, Pacific Beach Club, Paradise Park, and several subdivisions near Sag Harbor.

The state of Maine is known as Vacationland, but before the passage of the state's civil rights law governing public accommodations in 1971 racial discrimination was common. A number of Black-owned businesses in Maine catered to Black travelers. Two of the most famous are Rock Rest in Kittery, which operated as a summer guest house from 1946 to 1977, and Cummings' Guest House in Old Orchard Beach, which operated from 1923 to 1993.

The invention of the automobile further increased opportunities for affluent Black Americans to travel, as it removed obstacles of segregation on railroad cars, but travel by car also increased the risk of inadvertently stopping at segregated lodging and dining establishments or driving through a sundown town. In 1936 The Negro Motorist Green Book was created to address this danger.

Travel and leisure marketing 
The travel and tourism industry traditionally was marketed exclusively using images of white travelers. According to Dillette and Benjamin, as of 2018 the industry continued to primarily depict white travelers in images. The lack of depictions of people of color, except when seen in service roles, contributes to real and perceived ideas that Black people do not travel.

Modern movement 
In 2011 the first Black Travel Movement company, Nomadness, was created by Evita Robinson with the goal of connecting Black people with travel opportunities that had not been previously marketed to Black travelers. As of 2022 Dillette and Benjamin counted 20 such companies, referring them as "social entrepreneurships" because the typical organizational goal, in addition to profit, is effecting social change within the travel sphere.

See also 

 The Negro Motorist Green Book
 AAA racial discrimination
 Sundown town

References 

African-American culture
African-American society
Social entrepreneurship in the United States